Aldo Banse (born 4 December 2002) is an Italian football player of Burkinabé descent. He plays for Serie D club Cjarlins Muzane.

Club career
He made his senior debut for Pordenone on 30 September 2020 in a Coppa Italia game against Casarano. He made his Serie B debut for Pordenone on 13 February 2021 in a game against Cittadella. He substituted Gianvito Misuraca in the 81st minute of a 0–1 home loss. He collected two more appearances in his debut professional season, both of which as a substitute.

On 31 January 2022, Banse moved on loan to Cjarlins Muzane in Serie D.

References

External links
 

2002 births
People from the Province of Pordenone
Footballers from Friuli Venezia Giulia
Italian people of Burkinabé descent
Italian sportspeople of African descent
Living people
Italian footballers
Association football forwards
Pordenone Calcio players
A.S.D. Cjarlins Muzane players
Serie B players
Serie D players